The Truth Is... may refer to:

 The Truth Is... (Failsafe album), 2008
 The Truth Is... (Theory of a Deadman album), 2011
 The Truth Is (Alexandra Burke album), 2018
 The Truth Is (TV program), an Australian current affairs television program

See also 
 Truth Is (disambiguation)